Jarrod Geddes (born 24 February 1994) is an Australian track and field athlete specialising in the 100 metres who has competed in the World Championships.

Records and rankings
Geddes is a one-time bronze medalist in the 100 metres in the Australian National Track & Field Championships. He is also a one-time gold medalist, also in the 100 metres, in the Australian National Junior Track & Field Championships. Geddes's current Australian all-time rankings are listed below.

Source:

Competitions

Youth World Championships
Geddes competed at the 2011 World Youth Championships in Athletics in Lille, France. He was selected and competed in the 100 metres. Geddes competed in heat two and finished 1st in a time of 10.66. This performance qualified him for the semi-final where he competed in semi-final two. In the semi-final Geddes, again, finished 1st in a time of 10.76. He drew lane three in the final  and finished 6th.

Senior World Championships
Geddes was selected for the World Championships in the 4 x 100 metres relay along with Tim Leathart, Joshua Ross and Andrew McCabe. The team competed in heat 3  but did not finish.

World Relay Championships
Geddes competed in the 2014 World Relay Championships. He was selected in the 4 x 100 metres relay with Joel Bee, Jin Su Jung, Tom Gamble, Jake Hammond and Alexander Hartmann. Geddes, Hartmann, Su Jung and Hammond were chosen as the four to compete in the actual event. They finished 6th in heat one in a time of 39.21. This didn't qualify them for the final but they competed in final B, where they did not finish.

Statistics

Personal bests

Source:

Achievements

References

1994 births
Australian male sprinters
Living people
World Athletics Championships athletes for Australia
Place of birth missing (living people)
Athletes (track and field) at the 2014 Commonwealth Games
Commonwealth Games competitors for Australia